This table lists the vowel letters of the International Phonetic Alphabet.

See also
 List of consonants
 Index of phonetics articles

Vowels